The 1828 United States presidential election in Massachusetts took place between October 31 and December 2, 1828, as part of the 1828 United States presidential election. Voters chose 15 representatives, or electors to the Electoral College, who voted for President and Vice President.

Massachusetts voted for the National Republican candidate, incumbent president John Quincy Adams, over the Democratic candidate, Andrew Jackson. Adams won Massachusetts by a landslide margin of 60.97%.

With 76.36% of the popular vote, Adams' home state would prove to be his second strongest victory in the 1828 election after neighboring Rhode Island.

Results

See also
 United States presidential elections in Massachusetts

References

Massachusetts
1828
1828 Massachusetts elections